Linda Margaret McDowell  (born 1949) is a British geographer and academic, specialising in the ethnography of work and employment. She was Professor of Geography at the University of Oxford from 2004 to 2016.

Early life and education
McDowell studied for her PhD as a part-time student at the Bartlett School of Planning, where she had previously earned a master's degree. 
Supervised by Peter Cowan, she researched housing change in London.

Academic career
Prior to completing her PhD, she lectured at the Open University. She then returned to the University of Cambridge, where she had studied as an undergraduate. 
She took a chair at London School of Economics in 1999, after which she moved first to University College London and then, in 2004, to the University of Oxford.

She is an economic geographer, who describes herself as an ethnographer of work and employment. 
She wrote the first paper on feminism in the journal Society and Space, while her three books on work and gender —-Capital Culture: Gender at Work in the City, which explored the role of gender in the City of London's financial services; Gender, Place and Identity, which offered a broader introduction to gender and geography; and Redundant Masculinities, which explored masculinity in the context of economic downturns — have been major contributions to feminist geography and geographies of gender. More recently, her research has explored labour and economic migration since 1945.

McDowell's work has received numerous awards. From the Royal Geographical Society she has been awarded the Back Award and the Victoria Medal. In 2008, she became a fellow of the British Academy. She is also a fellow of the Academy of Social Sciences. McDowell has edited the journals Area and Antipode.

She was appointed Commander of the Order of the British Empire (CBE) in the 2016 New Year Honours for services to geography and higher education.

Selected publications
 (2016) Migrant Women's Voices: talking about life and work in the UK since 1945. Bloomsbury,. 
 (2013) Working Lives: Gender, Migration and Employment in Britain, 1945-2007. Wiley-Blackwell. .
 (2009) Working Bodies: Interactive service employment and workplace identities. Wiley-Blackwell. . 
 (2005) Hard Labour: the forgotten voices of Latvian migrant 'volunteer' workers. UCL Press / Cavendish Publishing, London. .
 (2003) Redundant Masculinities? Employment change and white working class youth. Blackwell, Oxford. .
 (1999) Gender, Identity and Place. Cambridge: Polity.
 (1997) Capital Culture: Gender at Work in the City of London. Oxford: Blackwell
 (1991). Life without father and Ford: The new gender order of post-Fordism. Transactions of the Institute of British Geographers 400-419
 (1991). Multiple voices: Speaking from inside and outside the project. Antipode 24, 56-72

References

British geographers
Academics of the University of Oxford
Academics of the University of Cambridge
Alumni of Newnham College, Cambridge
Academics of the Open University
Academics of the London School of Economics
Academics of University College London
Fellows of St John's College, Oxford
Fellows of the Academy of Social Sciences
Fellows of the British Academy
Living people
1949 births
People from Stockport
21st-century British women scientists
Commanders of the Order of the British Empire
Women geographers
21st-century British women writers
Victoria Medal recipients